Mosman, is a suburb of Sydney in New South Wales, Australia.

Mosman may also refer to:

People
 Frans Mosman (1904–1994), Dutch olympic fencer
 Hugh Mosman (1843–1909), Australian mine owner and politician
 John Mosman (apothecary), Scottish servant of James IV and Margaret Tudor
 John Mosman (goldsmith), maker of the Scottish crown
 James Mosman (died 1573), Scottish goldsmith
 Michael W. Mosman (born 1956), American jurist

Other
 Mosman Art Prize, an annual award in Australia
 Mosman Bay, a bay of Sydney Harbour near Mosman, Australia
 Mosman House, in Fort Collins, Colorado, USA

See also
 Mosman Park, Western Australia, a town
 Mossman (disambiguation)